Mesorhizobium robiniae is a gram-negative, aerobic, non-spore-forming motile bacteria from the genus Mesorhizobium which was isolated from root nodule of Robinia pseudoacacia which was found in Yangling in the Shaanxi province in China.

References

External links
Type strain of Mesorhizobium robiniae at BacDive -  the Bacterial Diversity Metadatabase

Phyllobacteriaceae
Bacteria described in 2010